Medusa is the second studio album by British rock band Trapeze. Recorded in 1970 at Morgan Studios, it was produced by The Moody Blues bassist John Lodge and released in November 1970 by Threshold Records. The album was preceded by the release of the single "Black Cloud" in 1970.

Background
Following the release of Trapeze's self-titled debut album Trapeze in early 1970, lead vocalist John Jones and keyboardist Terry Rowley left the band, leaving guitarist Mel Galley, bassist Glenn Hughes and drummer Dave Holland to continue as a trio. Four of the seven songs on Medusa were written by Galley and his brother Tom, two were written by Hughes, and one was written by the trio.

Re-recording

The album's title track was re-recorded by Glenn Hughes in 2010 with Black Country Communion on their self-titled debut album.

Reception

Critical reception for Medusa was generally positive. A review published on AllMusic awarded the album four and a half out of five stars, with writer Jason Anderson describing the album as "the finest offering from '70s outfit Trapeze" and "one of the decade's most underappreciated hard rock recordings". Anderson praised Hughes's "soulful vocal delivery" and Galley's "catchy and affective" guitar performance, concluding that "it's a wonder that the record isn't mentioned more when influential albums of this era are discussed".

Track listing

Personnel

Primary personnel
Mel Galley – guitar, vocals
Glenn Hughes – bass, piano, vocals
Dave Holland – drums
John Lodge – production

Additional personnel
Roger Quested – engineering
Phil Travers – illustration
David Rohl – photography

References

1970 albums
Trapeze (band) albums
Threshold Records albums
Universal Records albums
Albums recorded at Morgan Sound Studios